Falmer is a village in the ceremonial county of East Sussex, near Brighton in the United Kingdom.

Falmer may also refer to:
 Falmer (Elder Scrolls), a fictional race of elves in the fantasy game Elder Scrolls
 The Falmer Stadium, a stadium near the village of Falmer, used by Brighton and Hove Albion football club

See also
 Falmer railway station
 Falmer High School

cs:Kmen
is:Stofn